is a railway station in the city of Sano, Tochigi, Japan, operated by the private railway operator Tobu Railway. The station is numbered "TI-35".

Lines

Station layout
Horigome Station has one island platform, connected to the station building by an underground passageway.

Platforms

Adjacent stations

History
Horigome Station opened on 23 June 1889. It was relocated 2.1 km from its original position in the direction of Sano Station on 20 March 1894.

From 17 March 2012, station numbering was introduced on all Tobu lines, with Horigome Station becoming "TI-35".

Passenger statistics
In fiscal 2019, the station was used by an average of 424 passengers daily (boarding passengers only).

Surrounding area
 Sano Horigome-nishi Post Office

See also
 List of railway stations in Japan

References

External links

 Tobu station information 
	

Tobu Sano Line
Stations of Tobu Railway
Railway stations in Tochigi Prefecture
Railway stations in Japan opened in 1894
Sano, Tochigi